Kristinn Steindórsson (born 29 April 1990) is an Icelandic professional footballer who plays for Breiðablik as a left midfielder.

International
Kristinn was called up to the senior squad for the first time in January 2015 for a pair of friendlies against Canada in Florida. He scored his first goal on 16 January 2015 in a 2–1 friendly win in the first match against Canada.

International goals
Score and result list Iceland's goal tally first.

References

External links
 

1990 births
Living people
Kristinn Steindorsson
Kristinn Steindorsson
Kristinn Steindorsson
Expatriate footballers in Sweden
Expatriate soccer players in the United States
Kristinn Steindorsson
Halmstads BK players
GIF Sundsvall players
Columbus Crew players
Kristinn Steindorsson
Kristinn Steindorsson
Superettan players
Allsvenskan players
Major League Soccer players
Association football midfielders
Kristinn Steindorsson
Kristinn Steindorsson
Kristinn Steindorsson